Mike or Michael Rowe may refer to:
Michael Rowe, television writer for Futurama
Michael Rowe (actor), Canadian actor
Michael Rowe (director) (born 1971), Australian Mexican film director
Mike Rowe (born 1962), host of the Discovery Channel show Dirty Jobs
Mike Rowe (ice hockey) (born 1965), Canadian retired ice hockey player
Mike Rowe, defendant in the case of Microsoft v. MikeRoweSoft
Michael Rowe (journalist) (born 1962), author
Mike Rowe (racing driver), American racing driver
 Mike Rowe, keyboard player in Noel Gallagher's High Flying Birds

See also
Michael Roe (disambiguation)